Jack Miller (10 August 1906 – October 1978) also known by the nickname of "Cod", due to his profession as a Fishmonger, was an English professional rugby league footballer who played in the 1920s, 1930s and 1940s. Over his 20-year career he made 526 appearances for Warrington, a club record which was broken in 1959 by Brian Bevan.

Background
Jack Miller was born in Newton-le-Willows, Lancashire, England.
Jack was married to Margaret who was a model and fashion assistant at Broadbents in Warrington.
They had 2 daughters June and Barbara (born 1937) and lived in Grappenhall, Warrington when they were younger.

Playing career

Warrington
Miller made his début for Warrington on Saturday 11 December 1926, and he played his last match for Warrington on Saturday 9 February 1946.

Miller played in Warrington's 15-2 victory over Salford in the 1929 Lancashire County Cup Final during the 1929–30 season at Central Park, Wigan on Sat 23 November 1929, the 10-9 victory over St. Helens in the 1932 Lancashire County Cup Final during the 1932–33 season at Central Park, Wigan on Saturday 19 November 1932, and he played left- in the 8-4 victory over Barrow in the 1937 Lancashire County Cup Final during the 1937–38 season at Central Park, Wigan on Saturday 23 October 1937.

Miller is also a Warrington Wolves Hall of Fame inductee.

Challenge Cup Final appearances
Jack Miller played right-, i.e. number 10, in Huddersfield's 13–9 aggregate victory over Bradford Northern in the 1944–45 Challenge Cup Final during the 1944–45 season; the 7-4 victory in the first-leg at Fartown Ground, Huddersfield on Saturday 28 April 1945, and the 6-5 victory in the second-leg at Odsal Stadium, Bradford on Saturday 5 May 1945.

Leigh
In November 1946, Miller was transferred to Leigh. He made 25 appearances for the club, scoring two tries.

International honours
Miller won caps for England while at Warrington in 1928 against Wales, in 1933 against Other Nationalities, in 1936 against France, and Wales, and won caps for Great Britain while at Warrington in 1933 against Australia (3 matches), and on the 1936 Great Britain Lions tour against Australia, and New Zealand (2 matches).

References

External links
 (archived by web.archive.org) Statistics at wolvesplayers.thisiswarrington.co.uk
 (archived by web.archive.org) Statistics at wolvesplayers.thisiswarrington.co.uk (martini)
 Image 'Huddersfield 13 Bradford 9' at huddersfieldrlheritage.co.uk

1906 births
1978 deaths
England national rugby league team players
English rugby league players
Great Britain national rugby league team players
Huddersfield Giants players
Leigh Leopards coaches
Leigh Leopards players
People from Newton-le-Willows
Place of death missing
Rugby league players from St Helens, Merseyside
Rugby league props
Rugby league second-rows
Warrington Wolves players